The Problem is an album by Wu-Tang Clan DJ Mathematics, released on June 28, 2005 by Nature Sounds. Most tracks have cameos by members of the Wu-Tang Clan. The Problem is Mathematics' second solo album.

Track listing
"Intro"
"C What I C" (T-Slugz and Eyeslow)
"Strawberries & Cream" (Allah Real, Inspectah Deck, The RZA and Ghostface Killah)
"Can I Rise" (HahFlamez)
"John  – 3:16" (Method Man and Panama P.I.)
"Winta Sno" (Eyeslow, L.S., and Ali Vegas)
"Two Shots Of Henny" (Buddah Bless, Angie Neil, HahFlamez, Eyeslow, Panama P.I. and Allah Real)
"Bullet Scar" (T-Slugz)
"Real Nillaz" (Ghostface Killah, Buddah Bless, Eyeslow, and Raekwon)
"Coach Talk" (Bald Head)
"Rush" (Method Man and GZA)
"U.S.A." (Ghostface Killah, Masta Killa, Todd, Panama P.I., Eyeslow and HahFlamez)
"Tommy" (Allah Real, Eyeslow, Angie Neil and Bald Head)
"Break That" (Ol Dirty Bastard, Masta Killa and U-God)
"Spot Lite" (Method Man, U-God, Inspectah Deck and Cappadonna) [bonus track]

Mathematics (producer) albums
2005 albums
Nature Sounds albums
Albums produced by Mathematics